A vapor barrier (or vapour barrier) is any material used for damp proofing, typically a plastic or foil sheet, that resists diffusion of moisture through the wall, floor, ceiling, or roof assemblies of buildings and of packaging to prevent interstitial condensation. Technically, many of these materials are only vapor retarders as they have varying degrees of permeability.

Materials have a moisture vapor transmission rate (MVTR) that is established by standard test methods. One common set of units is  g/m2·day or  g/100in2·day.  Permeability can be reported in perms, a measure of the rate of transfer of water vapor through a material (1.0 US perm = 1.0 grain/square-foot·hour·inch of mercury ≈ 57 SI perm = 57 ng/s·m2·Pa). American building codes have classified vapor retarders as having a water vapor permeance of 1 perm or less when tested in accordance with the ASTM E96 desiccant, or dry cup method.  Vapor-retarding materials are generally categorized as: 
Impermeable (≤1 US perm, or ≤57 SI perm) – such as asphalt-backed kraft paper, elastomeric coating, vapor-retarding paint, oil-based paints, vinyl wall coverings, extruded polystyrene, plywood, OSB; 
Semi-permeable (1-10 US perm, or 57-570 SI perm) – such as unfaced expanded polystyrene, fiber-faced isocyanurate, heavy asphalt-impregnated building papers, some latex-based paints); 
Permeable (>10 US perm, or >570 SI perm) – such as unpainted gypsum board and plaster, unfaced fiber glass insulation, cellulose insulation, unpainted stucco, cement sheathings, spunbonded polyolefin or some polymer-based exterior air barrier films.

Materials 
Vapor diffusion retarders are normally available as coatings or membranes. The membranes are technically flexible and thin materials, but sometime includes thicker sheet materials named as "structural" vapor diffusion retarders. The vapor diffusion retarders varies from all kinds of materials and keep updating every day, some of them nowadays even combined the functions of other building materials.

Materials used as vapor retarders:
 Elastomeric coatings can provide a vapor barrier and water proofing with permeability ratings of .016 perm rating with 10 mils/min. of coating and can be applied on interior or exterior surfaces. 
Aluminum foil, 0.05 US perm (2.9 SI perm).
 Paper-backed aluminum.
Asphalt or coal tar pitch, typically hot-applied to concrete roof decks along with reinforcement felts.
 Polyethylene plastic sheet, 0.03 US perm (1.7 SI perm).
 Advanced Polyethylene vapor retarders that pass the ASTM E 1745 standard tests ≤0.3 US perm (17 SI perm).
 Asphalt-coated kraft paper, often attached to one side of fiberglass batts, 0.40 US perm (22 SI perm).
 Metallized film
 Vapor retarder paints (for the air-tight drywall system, for retrofits where finished walls and ceilings will not be replaced, or for dry basements: can break down over time due to being chemically based).
 Extruded polystyrene or foil-faced foam board insulation.
 Exterior grade plywood, 0.70 US perm (40 SI perm).
 Most sheet type monolithic roofing membranes.
 Glass and metal sheets (such as in doors and windows).

Building construction

Moisture or water vapor moves into building cavities in three ways:
1) With air currents, 2) By diffusion through materials, 3) By heat transfer.
Of these three, air movement accounts for more than 98% of all water vapor movement in building cavities.
 A vapor retarder and an air barrier serve to reduce this problem, but are not necessarily interchangeable.

Vapor retarders slow the rate of vapor diffusion into the thermal envelope of a structure. Other wetting mechanisms, such as wind-borne rain, capillary wicking of ground moisture, air transport (infiltration), are equally important.

Usage 
The industry has recognized that in many circumstances it may be impractical to design and build building assemblies which never get wet. Good design and practice involve controlling the wetting of building assemblies from both the exterior and interior. So, the use of vapor barrier should be taken into consideration. Their use has already been legislated within the building code of some countries (such as the U.S., Canada, Ireland, England, Scotland & Wales). How, where, and whether a vapor barrier (vapor diffusion retarder) should be used depends on the climate. Typically, the number of heating degree days (HDD) in an area is used to help make these determinations. A heating degree day is a unit that measures how often outdoor daily dry-bulb temperatures fall below an assumed base, normally 18°C (65°F). 
For building in most parts of North America, where winter heating conditions predominate, vapor barrier are placed toward the interior, heated side of insulation in the assembly. In humid regions where warm-weather cooling predominates within buildings, the vapor barrier should be located toward the exterior side of insulation. In relatively mild or balanced climates, or where assemblies are designed to minimize condensation conditions, a vapor barrier may not be necessary at all.

An interior vapor retarder is useful in heating-dominated climates while an exterior vapor retarder is useful in cooling-dominated climates. In most climates it is often better to have a vapor-open building assembly, meaning that walls and roofs should be designed to dry: either to the inside, the outside, or both, so the ventilation of water vapor should be taken into consideration.
A vapor barrier on the warm side of the envelope must be combined with a venting path on the cold side of the insulation. This is because no vapor barrier is perfect, and because water  may get into the structure, typically from rain. In general, the better the vapor barrier and the drier the conditions, the less venting is required.

In areas below foundation level (subgrade areas), particularly those formed in concrete, vapor retarder placement can be problematic, as moisture infiltration from capillary action can exceed water vapor movement outward through framed and insulated walls.

Inside a steel building, water vapor will condense whenever it comes into contact with a surface that is below the dew point temperature. Visible condensation on windowpanes and purlins that results in dripping can be somewhat mitigated with ventilation; however insulation is the preferred method of condensation prevention.

Confusion with air barrier 
The function of a vapor barrier is to retard the migration of water vapor. A vapor barrier is not typically intended to retard the migration of air. This is the function of air barriers.  Air is mixed with water vapor. When air moves from location to location due to an air pressure difference, the vapor moves with it. This is a type of migration of water vapor. In the strictest sense air barriers are also vapor barriers when they control the transport of moisture-laden air.   It must be mentioned that the designated perm ratings do not reflect the diminished permeability of a given vapor retarder medium when affected by temperature differences on opposing sides of the medium. 
A discussion about the differences between vapor barriers and air barriers can be found in Quirouette.

Packaging

The ability of a package to control the permeation and penetration of gasses is vital for many types of products.  Tests are often conducted on the packaging materials but also on the completed packages, sometimes after being subjected to flexing, handling, vibration, or temperature.

See also
Air barrier
Heating, ventilation, and air conditioning (HVAC)
Infiltration

References

 Fine Homebuilding No. 169 March 2005 p. 78
 Fine Homebuilding No. 162, May 2004 p. 52

External links

Air Barriers vs. Vapor Barriers
Consumer's Guide to Vapor Barriers at the U.S. Department of Energy

Moisture protection
Psychrometrics
Heating, ventilation, and air conditioning